Golborne High School is a coeducational foundation secondary school located in Golborne, Metropolitan Borough of Wigan, England.

History
The oldest part of the school was opened in January 1954. This comprises the main corridor and its classrooms, and the Gymnasium. The school only admitted girls and was called the Girls' Secondary Modern School. In 1967 boys were admitted for the first time (having previously been educated at what later became Golborne County Junior School.) In 1969 Golborne became a Comprehensive School. New additions to the building included the Sports Hall (originally intended to be a swimming pool) and the RoSLA Block where the Sixth Form students were educated.

The school badge comprises a green shield, quartered by the red cross of St George of England. In each quarter of the shield are symbols representing the industry in the area- the black diamond representing coal mining, the crossed shuttles of the weaving industry, and a sheaf of wheat symbolising local agriculture. The fourth symbol is the red rose of Lancashire, although technically the school now lies in Greater Manchester since local government re-organisation in 1974.

Since this time there have been three major changes to the status of the school:
 In 1989 the 6th form closed with the final year taking their exams in 1990, the school lost its comprehensive state and became Golborne High.
 In 2007 in became a College of Visual Arts
 In 2010 it became a trust school under the umbrella of the newly formed Golborne and Lowton Co-operative Learning partnership

A proposed of merging with Lowton High School to form a new school of 1200 pupils, eventually moving to a new site in Lowton in 2012, was cancelled by the coalition government in July 2010. Both of the old schools would have been demolished which generated some local opposition.

The school took second place in a Salter's Festival of Chemistry contest. In July 2007 Golborne sent representatives to a Youth Summit to press for adult understand of youth issues..

In September 2007, the school was selected to host a display of lunar rock samples, which the students were allowed to handle.

Two students reached the National Final of a robot building competition in Milton Keynes, having won the heats of the contest at Salford University. Other students had their excellent artwork exhibited on the Saatchi Gallery's online facility.

In December 2008 Sir Ian McKellen, who was brought up in Wigan, visited the school to lend his support to the schools anti-bullying campaign.

Golborne was recognised as one of 100 schools with the largest increase on performance from 2002 to 2004, based on participation in GCSE exams. The school has continued to improve and 2009 achieved its best ever results with 51% of students achieving 5 good GCSE passes including English and Maths.

As far back as 2004, the school had been pursuing arts school status, which would provide for a more focused curriculum enhanced with state-of-the-art equipment. In September 2007, the school became a College of Visual Arts. Recently opened is the Digital Photography Suite which is intended not only for school use but for community groups. The school is to be equipped with its own art gallery.

Houses

The school is divided into five houses the names of which are derived from the names of famous artists in several fields: 
 Fonteyn – after Margot Fonteyn the ballerina
 Lennon – after John Lennon the Liverpool songwriter and member of The Beatles
 Picasso – after Pablo Picasso the artist
 Shakespeare – after William Shakespeare the playwright
 Westwood – after Vivienne Westwood the fashion designer

References

External links
Golborne High School

1954 establishments in England
Secondary schools in the Metropolitan Borough of Wigan
Educational institutions established in 1954
Foundation schools in the Metropolitan Borough of Wigan